This is the 2007–08 season in review for the Professional Bowlers Association (PBA). It was the Tour's 49th season and consisted of 21 events.

Season highlights
 Chris Barnes made the final match in four tournaments, winning two titles en route to PBA Player of the Year honors.  This marked the first PBA season that a points system (not a player vote) determined Player of the Year.
 Sean Rash became the second bowler (Hugh Miller was the other) to win titles in his first four televised appearances, as he captured his first major title at the USBC Masters in November.
 Walter Ray Williams, Jr. won two titles early in the season, raising his all-time PBA leading total to 44. This gave Williams a title in 15 straight seasons, tying Earl Anthony's 1970–84 streak. Williams also led the tour in average, setting the second-highest season mark in history at 228.34.
 Norm Duke completed a stunning comeback from an injury-marred first half (which put him in danger of losing his tour exemption) to win the last two majors of the season (PBA World Championship and 65th U.S. Open).
 Rookie Rhino Page set a record by making five televised finals while starting from the Tour Qualifying Round (TQR). He won his first PBA title in the Go RVing Classic – his fifth trip to the finals.
 Michael Haugen Jr. overcame a 53-pin sixth-frame deficit against Chris Barnes to win the H&R Block Tournament of Champions.
 Rob Stone took over play-by-play duties from Dave Ryan on ESPN broadcasts of the PBA Tour. 13-time PBA titleist Randy Pedersen continued as the on-air analyst.

Awards and leaders
Player Of The Year: Chris Barnes
Rookie Of The Year: Rhino Page
High Average Award: Walter Ray Williams, Jr. (228.34)
Money Leader: Norm Duke ($176,855)

Tournament results
 Majors are noted in boldface.

Marking the end of the 2007–08 PBA season on ESPN, the fourth annual Motel 6 Roll To Riches was contested on April 13, 2008 in Orlando.  In a unique format, six bowlers (Doug Kent, Sean Rash, Michael Haugen Jr., Norm Duke, Parker Bohn III and Chris Barnes) battled for a $150,000 winner-take-all prize. Parker Bohn III won the final "race to six strikes" against Norm Duke to take home the prize. (Earnings in this event do not count toward PBA career totals.)

References

External links
2007–08 Season Schedule

Professional Bowlers Association seasons
2007 in bowling
2008 in bowling